Woman in a Hat is a 1985 Polish drama film directed by Stanisław Różewicz. It was entered into the 14th Moscow International Film Festival where it won the Silver Prize.

Cast
 Hanna Mikuc as Ewa
 Maria Czubasiewicz as Grabowska
 Barbara Dziekan as Jadwiga
 Krzysztof Gosztyla as N.
 Mieczyslaw Grabka as Rysio
 Marek Kondrat as Lewicki
 Wieslawa Mazurkiewicz as Ewa's Mother
 Henryk Machalica as Jan Ziembinski
 Magdalena Wollejko as Magda
 Jan Kociniak as Janitor
 Tomasz Lengren as Film Director
 Wanda Stanislawska-Lothe as Zielinska

References

External links
 

1985 films
1985 drama films
1980s Polish-language films
Polish drama films